Pembina was a federal electoral district in Alberta, Canada, that was represented in the House of Commons of Canada from 1968 to 1988.

This riding was created in 1966 from parts of Athabaska, Edmonton West, Jasper—Edson and Vegreville ridings.

The riding was abolished in 1987 when it was redistributed in Beaver River, Edmonton East, Edmonton North, Edmonton Northwest, Edmonton Southeast, Edmonton—Strathcona, Elk Island, Peace River and St. Albert ridings.

Election results

See also 

 List of Canadian federal electoral districts
 Past Canadian electoral districts
 Pembina the Alberta provincial electoral district from 1909-1971.

External links
 

Former federal electoral districts of Alberta